Rineloricaria sneiderni is a species of catfish in the family Loricariidae. It is native to South America, where it occurs in high-altitude brooks in the Jurubidá River basin in Colombia, with its type locality being listed as near Nuquí. The species reaches 18 cm (7.1 inches) in length and is believed to be a facultative air-breather.

References 

Loricariidae
Fish described in 1944
Taxa named by Henry Weed Fowler
Catfish of South America
Fish of Colombia